The Visby class is a warship in use by the Swedish Navy. Its design emphasizes low visibility radar cross-section and infrared signature, and the class has received widespread international attention because of its capabilities as a stealth ship. 

The first ship in the class is named after Visby, the main city on the island of Gotland. 

The Visby ships are designed by Swedish Defence Materiel Administration (FMV) and built by Saab Kockums AB in Karlskrona. The first ship of the class was launched in 2000, but production then suffered repeated delays. The fifth and last ship was delivered in 2015.

In 2021, an order was placed for the development of a second generation of evolved Visby corvettes.

Design
The hull is constructed with a sandwich design consisting of a PVC core with a carbon fibre and vinyl laminate (see also the Oceanic-Creations spin-off). There are multiple advantages to using composite materials in ship hulls. Good conductivity and surface flatness means a low radar signature, while good heat insulation lowers the infrared signature and increases survivability in case of fire. The composite sandwich used is also non-magnetic, which lowers the magnetic signature. Composites are also very strong for their relative weight, and less weight means a higher top speed and better maneuverability. The composite weighs roughly 50% less than the equivalent strength steel.

Visbys angular tumblehome design reduces its radar signature. Jan Nilsson, one of the designers, told BBC News Online: "We are able to reduce the radar cross-section by 99%. That doesn't mean it's 99% invisible, it means that we have reduced its detection range." The 57 mm cannon barrel can be folded into the turret to reduce its cross-section. There are plans for additional improvements in this area, especially for the deck rails and masts.

History
Much of the design was based on the experiences learned from the experimental ship HSwMS Smyge. The class was originally designed to be divided into two subcategories where the last ship was optimized for surface combat and 4 others for submarine hunting; however, this was changed due to cutbacks.

A helicopter, such as the Agusta Westland A109M selected by Sweden, can land, take off, and refuel on the upper deck. A helicopter hangar was originally planned but was considered to be too cramped and was removed.

The ships took an exceptionally long time from launch to delivery and the construction has been fraught with repeated delays. In 2008, the only weapons system that had been integrated and tested in Visby was the gun.

Finally, on 16 December 2009, the next two of the corvettes were delivered to the Swedish Navy by the Försvarets materielverk (FMV). The two ships, K32 and K33, were delivered with underwater and surface/air sensors fully integrated. However, the only weapon that had been integrated and test-fired on the ships was still the Bofors 57 Mk3 gun. The FMV calls this version 4, which aims to get the ships into service and start training crews.

Version 5 is due in 2012 and is intended to supplement the ships with mine clearance systems, helicopter landing capability (only K31 is certified to date), anti-surface ship missiles, and additional stealth adaptation. Visby was the first of the corvettes to be upgraded to Version 5. On 22 March 2012 FMV reported that the ship had been modified and that the system would be tested before reentering the Swedish Navy by the end of 2012.

Although the design of the ships originally called for the installation of surface-to-air missiles, on 18 September 2008 the Genomförandegruppen cancelled the project in order to rationalize the procurement of defence materiel for the Swedish defence.

Mid-life upgrade 
In January 2021 Saab and the Swedish Defense Materiel Administration (FMV) signed a contract for the mid-life upgrade of the five Visby corvettes. The MLU will include the installation of surface-to-air missiles, the implementation of upgraded anti-ship missiles & anti-submarine torpedoes, improved sensors and enhanced electronic warfare capabilities. The upgrade of all five ships will be completed before 2030 and the MLU aims to keep the Visby corvettes operationally relevant beyond 2040

Second Generation

In January 2021 FMV and SAAB also signed an agreement for the product definition phase of the Visby Generation 2 corvettes. The new corvettes are to be equipped with modern anti-ship missiles, surface-to-air missiles and anti-submarine torpedoes. Four Visby Gen 2 corvettes will be built with the first two ships scheduled for delivery to the Swedish navy around the year 2030 with the latter two ships being delivered sometime between 2031-2035. Rear admiral Ewa Skoog Haslum stated that the Visby generation 2 corvettes will be larger than the current Visby corvettes, stating that increased range and crew complement are the main reasons for this change. On 1 November 2022 the Supreme Commander of the Swedish armed forces, general Micael Bydén published his recommendations for how the armed forces should grow over the coming years at the request of the Swedish government. This included the recommendation that the upcoming Visby Gen 2 corvettes should be equipped with longer range surface-to-air missiles than those which will be used on the "Visby Gen 1" in order for the ships to be able to act as part of NATO Integrated Air and Missile Defences. Further recommendations included modifications to the ships to increase their interoperability with both NATO's standing maritime groups and the UK Joint Expeditionary Force.

Units 

All systems for the ship Uddevalla were acquired, but the ship was later canceled, so there are now plans to build a full Visby class simulator.

PTK Visby, the lead ship of the class, is doing system tests and readying the ships for active service within the Swedish Navy. The formation is under the 3rd Naval Warfare Flotilla but takes its orders from the FMV. The system tests are taking a long time partly because of funding issues and partly because of the novel and cutting-edge nature of the platform.

Similar ships
Tuo Chiang stealth corvette (Taiwan)
 (United Arab Emirates)
 (Finland)
Type 022 missile boat (China)
Milgem-class corvette (Turkey)
 (Norway)

Gallery

References

External links

Official builder's homepage (as of 2018) 
Swedish navy page on the Visby trials 
Naval-Technology - www.naval-technology.com

Corvette classes
 
 
Stealth ships